Bubungan Dua Belas (in Malay bubungan (or bum bungan) is roof, dua belas is twelve) or House of Twelve Roofs is located in Jalan Residency, at the foot of Bukit Subok Forest Reserve Recreational Park and about one mile from south of the center of Bandar Seri Begawan, Brunei. It was formerly the official residence of British residents and high commissioners in Brunei and was built in 1906 during the tenure of the first resident Malcolm Stewart Hannibal McArthur. It is one of the oldest surviving building in Bandar Seri Begawan. It served as a gallery that exhibits the long-standing relationship between the sultanate and the United Kingdom. The museum is currently closed for renovations.

History 
The first house at the site of Bubungan dua belas was built by Great Britain's Consul General in Brunei  Spenser St. John during reign of Sultan Abdul Momin,  in 1856 as a temporary "leaf house" that was replaced in 1858 with a permanent building. That house fell into disrepair following Spenser St John departure to Haiti and by 1907 had become a jungle-eaten ruin. 

That house was commemorated during 100th anniversary of Bubungan dua belas by Brunei postal authorities $1 stamp. The house was demolished around 1940.

In December 1905 Sultan Hashim Jalilul Alam Aqamaddin allowed for a British Resident to be placed in Brunei. McArthur was appointed British Resident and in 1906 he had decided to build a new consulate on exactly the same spot as the former St John's house. The wooden Bubungan dua belas or the House of Twelve Roofs construction was completed by July 1907.
 The house served as a residence of a total of 25 British Residents and High Commissioners.

Renovations 
The building was restored due to its historical and  architectural significance by a joint Brunei and United Kingdom project in 1998. Queen Elizabeth II took part at the  opening of the building as exhibition in April the same year. The building was renovated in 2007.  In 2015, reportedly the museum was closed for renovation. In 2022, renovations at the museum was completed.

See also 
 List of museums in Brunei

References

Further reading

External links
 100th anniversary of Bubungan dua belas is commemorated by Brunei postal services department

Buildings and structures in Bandar Seri Begawan
Museums in Brunei
Historic sites in Brunei